Electric Love is an electronic dance music festival held in Austria annually since 2013.

Electric Love may also refer to:

 Electric Love (album), by Dirty Vegas, 2011
 "Electric Love" (song), by Børns, 2014
 Electric Love, a 1987 VHS by the Cult

See also